David John Springbett (1938-2022) was a British philatelist and former insurance broker, who signed the Roll of Distinguished Philatelists in 2004.

Philatelic activity 
Springbett was President of the Grand Prix Club, a fellow of the Royal Philatelic Society London, President of The Revenue Society and a former Chairman of the Stanley Gibbons company.

He was Chairman of The Stamp Show 2000 in Earls Court, London and was involved in planning for an alternative stamp exhibition to the London 2010 International Stamp Exhibition. The alternative show would have been based at the ExCel conference centre in east London but the project was abandoned when the Fédération Internationale de Philatélie (FIP) gave the London 2010 show approved status.

In 2001 Springbett edited and compiled a biographical guide to the more than seventy philatelists who have been awarded a Grand Prix award at
a philatelic exhibition held between 1950 and 2000.

His philatelic interests lay in revenue stamps and the large key plate stamps of Nyasaland. He won a Grand Prix medal for his exhibit of Straits Settlements at Bangkok in 1993 and was a candidate for a Grand Prix with his Nyasaland revenue stamps in Australia in 1999 and Nyasaland key types at Istanbul 1999.

Outside philately 
David Springbett was an insurance broker and a campaigner on behalf of Lloyds names.

Along with Malcolm Pearson and John Webb he founded Pearson Webb Springbett in 1964 which eventually became PWS Holdings.

He lived in Taplow, Buckinghamshire.

World record flight 
In 1980, Springbett set a world record for a circumnavigation of the world as a passenger on scheduled airline flights by completing the trip in 44 hours and six minutes with the help of supersonic travel on the Concorde. He also beat the record for a circumnavigation of any kind which previously stood at 45 hours and 19 minutes.

References

Publications 
The Grand Prix Club Book 1950–2000, David Feldman, Geneva, Switzerland, 2001. 

British philatelists
Revenue stamps
1938 births
Fellows of the Royal Philatelic Society London
Living people
Signatories to the Roll of Distinguished Philatelists